The Capital Area Transportation Authority (CATA) is the public transit authority serving the Lansing, Michigan area, including service on the campus of Michigan State University.

History 
CATA was founded in 1972.

CATA was the first transit system in the United States to operate electric buses, following a grant from the Model Cities Program. Six electric buses entered service in May 1973, though following a drop in ridership, the project was abandoned in September 1974.

In 1999, Michigan State University discontinued its bus services, and CATA took over operations of bus service on campus. Fares were initially charged for these routes, before a 2019 pilot program led to a permanent removal of fares.

In 2006, CATA became the first transit agency in Michigan to operate diesel-electric hybrid buses. The system continued to exclusively buy hybrid buses through 2016, before returning to conventional diesel in 2019 as the first Michigan operator of the Nova Bus LFS.

CATA significantly altered its intra-campus (routes 30–39) Spartan Service bus routes serving Michigan State University beginning Fall 2009. Changes include Routes 30 & 31 having extended weeknight hours, Routes 34-36 having service only on the weekends, and the creation of Route 39, linking University Village and Spartan Village to the main campus. As a result, both Routes 31 & 32 saw route changes as well. Since August 25, 2014, Route 31 no longer changes into Route 30 at East Neighborhood, and vice versa.

In August 2014, CATA introduced the CATAnow system to provide real-time bus departure information.

Michigan/Grand River Avenue Transportation Study 
CATA partnered with metropolitan municipalities beginning in the summer of 2009 to study and evaluate transit improvements to Route 1, which runs from downtown Lansing to the Meridian Mall.  Improvements being evaluated include enhancing the existing bus system, adding bike lanes, improving intersections, or upgrading the existing route from a bus line to a bus rapid transit line, light rail, or a modern streetcar line. The CATA Board of Directors formally adopted bus rapid transit as the locally preferred alternative for the corridor on February 16, 2011. This authorized the transit to submit an application to be part of the Federal Transit Administration Small Starts program, which would provide substantial funding for the capital costs of construction this line.  The proposal was moved to the FTA's project development phase in April 2013, which includes getting funding for an environmental review and design and engineering activities.  Citing a potential lack of federal funding for the project from the Trump administration, the authority's board voted in April 2017 to suspend the project until federal funding could be committed to the project.

Operations 
CATA operates scheduled fixed-route bus and paratransit services across a  area throughout Ingham County and portions of Eaton and Clinton counties. 

CATA has approximately 340 employees, of which nearly 224 are bus operators. In 2016, 46% of CATA's operating revenue came from local sources, another 30% from state sources, and 24% came from fares and additional sources. In fiscal 2019, CATA logged 11,049,317 rides – an increase of 6.4 percent over the previous fiscal year.

Fixed routes 
CATA operates 32 bus routes with both rigid  and articulated  buses.  The system's main hub is the CATA Transportation Center (CTC) in downtown Lansing, with a satellite hub, the MSU-CATA Transportation Center (MSU-CTC), at Michigan State University.

Many of the MSU-area routes are called "Spartan Service". This means that the route only operates during the MSU fall and spring semesters. This includes all routes numbered 30–36 and 39, Lot Link and Night Owl.  Other routes (routes 1, 23, 25 and 26) are partially Spartan Service, that is, they run more frequently and/or longer into the night during the semesters.

Current fixed routes 
Effective March 2023.

Routes 1–16 are Lansing-area routes
 Routes 20–26 are east-area routes (East Lansing, Okemos, Haslett)
 Routes 30–39 are MSU-area routes and only run during MSU fall and spring semesters
 Routes 46-48 are limited stop commuter routes, which make one trip daily in each direction during peak hours

Paratransit 

CATA operates several paratransit services using small buses and mini vans. One service, Spec-Tran, is offered to persons with disabilities who are unable to use fixed route service. The "Night Owl", offers rides across the MSU campus every night from 2 am to 7 am (9 am on weekends) in order to give students a safer way to traverse campus at these hours.

Fares 
CATA offers a variety of payment methods and fares.

Cash and CATACash 
Riders paying by cash use the following fare structure for each one-way trip.  All transfers from one route to another are free and valid up to two hours. Transfer may not be used to make a return trip; stopovers on issuing line is allowed. All routes are one zone fares.

Seniors, disabled, all Medicare card holders, and students: $0.60
Limit is 3.
All others: $1.25

CATACash cards are issued through the farebox as change during cash transactions.

Tokens and passes 
Riders may use one CATA token for a one-way trip; again, transfers to another route, good for 120 minutes, are free; round-trips prohibited; stopovers allowed on issuing line only. Tokens may be purchased for $1.25 each or in sets of 10 for $10 at various retail outlets around the area. They cannot be purchased on board buses.

Various bus passes are available that may be used on any numbered route (except commuter lot pass). They may be purchased at various retail outlets in the area or online at CATA's website.  There are also passes for paratransit services such as CATA Rural Service and Spec-Tran.
10-Ride Pass: $10 ($6 for seniors, disabled, Medicare card holders, and students)
31-Day Pass (unlimited rides for 31 days): $35 ($18 for seniors, disabled, Medicare card holders, and students)
Student Semester Pass (unlimited rides for one semester, for students only): $50
MSU Commuter Lot Pass (unlimited rides on Route 32 only): $20 for one semester, $33 for two semesters

Governance 
CATA is governed by a board of directors:
Four members representing the City of Lansing:
Nathan Triplett (Chair)
Derek Melot
Dusty Fancher (Vice Chair)
Jennie Gies
Two members representing the City of East Lansing:
Shanna Draheim
Jack Schmitt
Two members representing Meridian Township:
Phil Deschaine
Robin Lewis
One member representing Lansing Township:
Diontrea Hayes
One member representing Delhi Township:
Douglas Lecato
One member representing Ingham County:
Mark Grebner
One member representing Michigan State University:
John Prush

Fleet 
Current fixed-route fleet

References 

Bus transportation in Michigan
Paratransit services in the United States
Transportation in Lansing, Michigan
East Lansing, Michigan